Khen (real name Hen Falah) is an Israeli DJ and music producer based in Tel Aviv.

Discography

Albums
Children With No Name (with Guy Mantzur), 2016

Singles & EPs
"My Golden Cage" (with Guy Mantzur), Bedrock, 2019
"Carolina (Hermanez Remix)", Lost & Found, 2018
"Dreamcatcher (original mix)", Vivrant, 2017
"Carolina", Lost & Found, 2016
"Sense of Time, Sudbeat, 2013
"pito corto, Sudbeat, 2012
"el gato volador under beat rmx, Sudbeat, 2012
"namasteeeee, Sudbeat, 2012

References

 
Electronic dance music DJs
Israeli DJs
Progressive house musicians
Remixers